Sir George Fleetwood (1564 – 21 December 1620) was an English politician who sat in the House of Commons at various times between 1586 and 1611. 

Fleetwood was a younger son of Thomas Fleetwood  of The Vache, Chalfont St Giles, Buckinghamshire, and his second wife, Bridget Spring, daughter of Sir John Spring of Lavenham, Suffolk. He was educated at New Inn and was at Middle Temple in 1580. He inherited the Vache estate in Buckinghamshire from his father.

In 1586, he was elected Member of Parliament for Wycombe. He was a J.P. for Buckinghamshire from about 1586 and High Sheriff of Buckinghamshire for 1590–91. He was a gentleman pensioner from 1597 until his death. He was knighted in 1603 and in 1604 elected MP for Tavistock. 
 
Fleetwood married Katherine Denny, daughter of Henry Denny, dean of Chester, and his wife Honora Grey, daughter of William Grey, 13th Baron Grey de Wilton  and Lady Mary Somerset on 19 April 1586. According to the History of Parliament Online, she was "the relative and probably ward of Sir Francis Walsingham", spymaster to Queen Elizabeth. They had eight sons and six daughters. He was the brother of Henry Fleetwood and William Fleetwood. His seventh son was James Fleetwood, Bishop of Worcester. Via his son Charles (died 1628) he had a grandson named after him, George Fleetwood (1623–1672), who was an English major-general and one of the regicides of King Charles I of England.

References

 

1564 births
1620 deaths
Members of the Middle Temple
High Sheriffs of Buckinghamshire
English MPs 1586–1587
English MPs 1604–1611
Knights Bachelor
Members of the Parliament of England for Tavistock
English justices of the peace